DJ Harvey (born Harvey Bassett) is a DJ born in Cambridge, England. He was an early exponent of the US disco/garage/house sound in the UK.

Career

Ersatz and transition to DJing (1978–1991)
At age 13, he became a drummer for a Cambridge punk band, Ersatz. The band formed an indie label, Leisure Sounds, releasing the single "Smile in Shadow", which was broadcast on BBC Radio 1 by John Peel. Ersatz released records with Harvey on drums from 1978 to 1983.

On a trip to New York City in 1985, Harvey was inspired by the emerging hip-hop movement. He felt that "cutting up" breaks was an extension of drumming and so purchased his first pair of Technics, brought them home and practised. He was a graffiti artist and member of the group TDK (Tone Deaf Crew), which was later renamed TONKA Hi Fi. The group threw weekend-long parties in Cambridge, Brighton, London and on the festival circuit. The Brighton parties continued for five years, from 1988 to 1993, to The Zap Club, and, after the club closed at 2 am, on the beach at Black Rock.

His focus moved from hip hop, electro and disco to house music and garage, and he began playing more parties in London with the US DJs Francois Kevorkian and Kenny Carpenter, playing at clubs including Solaris and Freedom.

In 1991, Harvey was a full-time DJ with his own weekly night "Moist" at the Gardening Club in London. He brought over DJs from New York City and other US cities including Larry Levan, He held six-hour mixes of disco, house, garage and rock records, a sound he has carried through to later residencies, including at the Hard Left at the Blue Note.

Ministry of Sound, collaborations and other projects (1990s—present)
After Moist ended, Harvey began a residency at London's Ministry of Sound. Harvey's association with Ministry of Sound resulted in a 1996 mix album, Late Night Sessions. He played for clubs including Cream in Liverpool and Back to Basics in Leeds, and in Ibiza.

He is one half of the duo behind the Black Cock record label, on which he has recreated edits of disco records by house music artists including Larry Levan and Ron Hardy. 

Harvey was married in Hawaii where he resided and founded a gallery and nightclub thirtyninehotel in Honolulu, Oahu with his ex-wife, and played at the club exclusively. He has also collaborated with Thomas Bullock (of Rub'N'Tug and A.R.E. Weapons) on the disco rock project Map of Africa.

He relocated to Los Angeles, and performed around the US with a bi-monthly residency at Santos in New York. His debut tour of Australia ended in him destroying $15,000 worth of DJ gear in a rumoured homage to his idol Jimi Hendrix as he played the sunrise set at the Meredith Music Festival. In 2012 he played alongside DJ James Murphy of LCD Soundsystem at MOCA, as well as PS1 NY for Kraftwerk and FYF Fest.

His new recording project is as Locussolus, a project released on International Feel Recordings. He released singles in 2012, featuring vocals by Tara Selleck (niece of actor Tom Selleck), actress Sam Fox, and DJ Heidi Lusardi.

In 2013, Harvey opened an online store "Harvey's General Store" with his son Harley, where he sells various merchandise as well as music both new and old.

In the summer of 2014, he released an album with a new band, Wildest Dreams, on Smalltown Supersound. The album was well received.

In 2014, at the DJ Awards in Ibiza, Harvey was the recipient of the Outstanding Contribution Award, in recognition of his body of work and influence within the electronic music industry.

In 2018, he appeared in a scene as himself in the movie Mission: Impossible – Fallout.

Harvey composed the score for the 2022 short film Bad Acid.

References

External links
 – official site

http://www.rollingstone.com/music/lists/the-25-djs-that-rule-the-earth-20121109/dj-harvey-19691231
https://web.archive.org/web/20130117162318/http://fyffest.com/artists/dj-harvey
http://www.brownpapertickets.com/event/245653
http://www.deepspacenyc.com/static_content/harvey_bio.html

English DJs
Living people
Year of birth missing (living people)
People from Cambridge
Musicians from Cambridgeshire
Remixers
Electronic dance music DJs